Tilouli is a village in the bhagalpur, block  &--> Deoria district of Uttar Pradesh, India.

Villages in Deoria district